Cairo Skywatch Tower, also known as Delta Lima 3 Green Ground Observation Tower, is a historic watchtower located in Tippecanoe Township, Tippecanoe County, Indiana.  It was built in 1952, and is a 40-foot tall wooden structure.  It once had a glass-enclosed office.  It was the first officially commissioned rural skywatch tower by the United States Air Force's Civilian Ground Observation Corps under the Operation Skywatch program.

It was listed on the National Register of Historic Places in 2002.

References

Buildings and structures on the National Register of Historic Places in Indiana
Buildings and structures completed in 1952
Buildings and structures in Tippecanoe County, Indiana
National Register of Historic Places in Tippecanoe County, Indiana